

Events 
 July – Annibale Zoilo resigns from the Sistine Chapel Choir, due to ill health.

Publications 
Giovanni Animuccia – Third book of laudi (Rome: Antonio Blado), also includes "" (an instruction for encouraging and retaining the converted sinner)
Joachim a Burck – , two volumes (of the lyrics of Ludwig Helmbold) (Mühlhausen: Georg Hantzsch), a collection of hymns
Eucharius Hoffmann – 24  for four, five, and six voices (Wittenberg: Johann Schwertel), a collection of motets
Paolo Isnardi – Second book of madrigals for five voices (Venice: Angelo Gardano)
Orlande de Lassus
 (Masses for various voices) (Paris: Le Roy & Ballard)
 (Several new pieces) for two voices (Munich: Adam Berg)
Mattheus Le Maistre –  for three voices (Dresden: Gimel Bergen)
Cristofano Malvezzi – First book of ricercars for four voices (Perugia: Pietroiacomo Petrucci)

Classical music 

Johannes Eccard –

Births 
probable – Robert Jones, English lutenist and composer (died 1617)

Deaths 
 none listed

References

 
Music
16th century in music
Music by year